WWE 2K23 is a 2023 professional wrestling sports video game developed by Visual Concepts and published by 2K Sports. It is the twenty-third overall installment of the video game series based on WWE, the tenth game under the WWE 2K banner, and the successor to WWE 2K22. The game was  released on March 17, 2023, for PlayStation 4, PlayStation 5, Windows, Xbox One, and Xbox Series X/S.

Gameplay

Like the previous game, WWE 2K23 features a hybrid of arcade and simulation gameplay. WarGames makes its debut for the first time in any WWE 2K game, which can be played offline with up to four players or online with up to eight players, alongside the Royal Rumble match now supporting online multiplayer with up to eight players. Game modes such as MyFACTION, MyGM, Showcase, Universe, career mode MyRISE and a full creation suite return with new features. Showcase features cover star John Cena, allowing players to recreate the most notable losses in his career, from his ECW One Night Stand 2006 matchup against Rob Van Dam for the WWE Championship to his Hell in a Cell 2009 matchup against "The Apex Predator" Randy Orton for the WWE Championship, featuring narration from Cena himself, which ends with three fictional matches, two matches where the player uses any of the eleven Superstars that defeated Cena during his career (including two versions of The Undertaker, "The Rated R Superstar" Edge and "The Beast Incarnate" Brock Lesnar), hoping to defeat Cena one last time, but the player can't choose a mystery superstar, which is considered to be someone else, both taking place on Raw, one where Cena wins easily by quickly using his finisher, the Attitude Adjustment, taking revenge on his loss the first (or second) time he faced in the process, as a reference to the "LOLCENAWINS" meme, and one against an invincible version of himself, known as "Super Cena", with an overall rating of 100, considering it to take revenge on that chosen superstar's loss against Cena, but more personally, that chosen superstar "can't see him" as well, and a third and final match, where Cena faces off against Bruno Sammartino, Hulk Hogan and "Stone Cold" Steve Austin in an elimination match at Wrestlemania 38, under request by Raw commentator and host of the After The Bell podcast, Corey Graves.

The in-game tutorial now features The New Day's Xavier Woods, also known on UpUpDownDown as Austin Creed, who is creating his own chapter in Cena's Showcase by training with Happy Corbin and Coach Drew Gulak at the WWE Performance Center for his fictional match against Cena at Wrestlemania 38. MyRISE features two distinct storylines: The Legacy, a female storyline where the created female superstar, being inspired by her sister, Justine, who won the WWE Women's Championship from her rival, Molly Holly, who became that superstar's mentor, on Raw as her first title win during her career, made her debut at Survivor Series: WarGames as a second generation superstar and the leader of Team Smackdown as the mysterious member, with Liv Morgan and "The EST of WWE" Bianca Belair, facing off against Team Raw, led by The Judgment Day's Rhea Ripley with "The Queen" Charlotte Flair and Damage CTRL's Bayley, in a six women tag team match, and The Lock, a male storyline where the created male superstar, known as "The Lock", who learned the wisdom of veterans, such as former WCW wrestler, Tavish, debuted on Raw, winning the WWE Intercontinental Championship from Sami Zayn, who held the title for 65 days and is trying to rename his title to the "Sami-Continental Championship", as his mystery opponent, and is mentored by WWE Hall of Famer and the VP of Talent Development, "The Heartbreak Kid" Shawn Michaels, 5 hours before his debut. Both stories end at SummerSlam, with the superstar winning the title. MyFACTION has been updated with online play, MyGM adds four player support, five new playable GMs (UpUpDownDown's Battle of the Brands hosts, Xavier Woods (Austin Creed; SmackDown) and Tyler Breeze (Prince Pretty; Raw), Eric Bischoff, Kurt Angle and Mick Foley) match types, single's mid-card championships (WWE United States Championship in Raw, the WWE Intercontinental Championship in SmackDown and the NXT North American Championship in NXT and NXT 2.0) and two new brands (NXT 2.0 (the championships are the same as NXT) and WCW (The WCW World Heavyweight Championship for the men's division, the WCW Women's Championship (using a custom design by 2K instead of the actual design) for the women's division, the WCW Hardcore Championship for the single's mid-card and the WCW World Tag Team Championship for the tag team division), with the main goal to earn 10 Hall of Fame trophies across multiple seasons of a MyGM campaign, in which are earned by completing career achievements and seasonal challenges, to be inducted into the WWE Hall of Fame, where you can keep playing or retire a save file, alongside the standard goal of winning the season (which now only has 25 weeks instead of choosing either 15, 25 or 50 weeks in WWE 2K22) after Wrestlemania (38 in this installment), with the WWE Slammy Awards now being awarded after Wrestlemania at the end of the season, along with new customizable options, including snake order (where the order is reversed), a customizable starting budget for the WWE Draft (which can now allow managers to draft at least nine superstars from the pool, but allow managers to keep up to three to six superstars, depending on their position from the previous season, before the draft in subsequent seasons) between $2.75 million to $3.5 million (which the chosen starting budget resets in subsequent seasons) and shake ups (which allows the ability to modify the rules during a season) and the creation suite includes the return of double championship entrances and advanced entrance options.

Development
According to Creative Director Lynell Jinks, the WarGames match type began development prior to WWE 2K22, and was made possible by the reworked engine following the failure of WWE 2K20.

Developer Andrea Listenberger told Fightful that the two storylines written in MyRISE were written by former WWE writers. The Lock follows a player-created male athlete-turned-wrestler making his debut on the WWE main roster. The Legacy follows a female second-generation wrestler rising through the ranks, aided by her aunt's rival Molly Holly.

On February 15, 2023, 2K released entrance footage of returning character Lita, which caused controversy on social media. Fans were critical of Lita's character model, citing a perceived lack of quality and the reuse of an attire which had been used from WWE 2K16 in 2015 to WWE 2K20 in 2019. Lita's model received alterations to the face prior to the release of the game.

Release 
On January 23, 2023, WWE 2K23 was officially announced with John Cena as the cover star. Bad Bunny was also announced as a playable character for players that pre-order the game, or purchase the Deluxe or Icon editions.

On January 30, 2K Games released behind-the-scenes footage of Cody Rhodes being scanned, who makes his first appearance under this name since WWE 2K15 following his return at WrestleMania 38.

The Deluxe Edition includes a season pass for future downloadable content, MyFACTION bonuses, and three days of early access on March 14. The Icon Edition features all Deluxe Edition content, as well as the "Ruthless Aggression Pack" which contains: classic versions of John Cena, Randy Orton, Brock Lesnar and Batista, the WrestleMania 22 arena, additional MyFACTION bonuses, and the John Cena Legacy Championship.

On March 6, 2023, the downloadable content for the game was announced. Five content packs containing 24 playable characters will be released from April to August, including superstars from Raw, SmackDown, NXT and Legends. These characters include: Bray Wyatt, Wade Barrett, Eve Torres, Zeus, Harley Race, the Steiner Brothers, Pretty Deadly and Hit Row among others.

Reception 

In a preview of the game, Dale Driver from IGN commented: "It can be argued that 2K22 set a new benchmark in terms of grappling gameplay, with my personal and perhaps controversial opinion being that the series is currently the best it's ever been." He also stated that the game largely felt the same as its predecessor with a few improvements.

WWE 2K23 received "generally favorable! reviews, according to review aggregator Metacritic.

References

External links
 

2023 video games
2K Sports games
Crossover video games
Multiplayer and single-player video games
Professional wrestling games
PlayStation 4 games
PlayStation 5 games
Sports video games with career mode
Take-Two Interactive games
Video games developed in the United States
Video games set in 1988
Video games set in 1997
Video games set in 1998
Video games set in 2002
Video games set in 2003
Video games set in 2006
Video games set in 2008
Video games set in 2009
Video games set in 2012
Video games set in 2014
Video games set in 2016
Video games set in 2018
Video games set in 2021
Video games set in 2022
Video games set in 2023
Video games with custom soundtrack support
Windows games
WWE video games
Xbox One games
Xbox Series X and Series S games